Ilo Mitkë Qafzezi (1889–1964) was a prolific Albanian scholar and writer of historical and religious subjects.

Life
Ilo Mitkë Qafzezi was born in 1889 in Korçë, Albania (then Ottoman Empire), to a family of mixed Albanian–Aromanian origins. He emigrated to Romania when he was thirteen and then to the United States. In 1924, he returned to Korçë, where he worked as a teacher and later as the school director of the Romanian school of the city, in use mostly by the Aromanian local community. Until World War II, he was known as the foremost Albanian biographer.

An autodidact, Qafzezi was very prolific in his publications in several literary and historical periodicals and bulletins. He also published important historical works on Moscopole, Berat and Vithkuq, and he discovered manuscripts of Theodore Kavalliotis's work, as well as a copy of the first edition of the Εισαγωγική Διδασκαλία ("Introductory instruction") of Daniel Moscopolites, published in Venice in 1794. Later, he discovered manuscripts of Kostandin Berati, as well as the primer of Naum Veqilharxhi, dated 1844. Qafëzezi translated into Albanian the Alipashiad, a poem on Ali Pasha of Tepelena, written originally in Greek, by Haxhi Shehreti. He also discovered an original Aromanian liturgical text from the 18th century known as the Aromanian Missal, which was posteriorly published by the Aromanian linguist Matilda Caragiu Marioțeanu in 1962.

References

1889 births
1964 deaths
Albanian palaeographers
People from Korçë
Albanian people of Aromanian descent
Aromanian translators
Aromanian scholars
19th-century Albanian people
20th-century Albanian people
People from Manastir vilayet
Albanian expatriates in Romania
Albanian expatriates in the United States
Translators of the Quran into Albanian
Greek–Albanian translators
Romanian–Albanian translators
19th-century translators
20th-century translators